Ringside is an indie rock band from Hollywood, California, originally formed in Los Angeles. They specialize in fusing indie rock with electronic beats. The band consists of Scott Thomas, (vocals, guitar, and keyboard), Kirk Hellie (guitarist), Sandy Chila (live drums), Max Allyn (live keys), and actor Balthazar Getty, who doubles as a beatmaker and producer. Scott Thomas' inspiration came from artists like The Stooges, The Clash, T. Rex, and Depeche Mode. Thomas eventually collaborated with Getty, who was already into making beats for underground hip-hop groups.

Their debut album Ringside was released on April 19, 2005, under Fred Durst's label Flawless Records and Geffen Records, with the single "Tired of Being Sorry" achieving moderate success. The song was later covered by singer/songwriter Enrique Iglesias on his eighth album Insomniac and was released as a single in Europe. Also the same song, "Tired of Being Sorry" was featured on the movie Her Minor Thing. The song "Struggle" from their self-titled album was featured on a Pontiac Torrent commercial, the movie Doom and on the TV series Six Feet Under. The track also appeared briefly on the ambient play list of the Schecter Guitars website.

The album, Lost Days was released on January 25, 2011. The song "Money" was featured in the movie Magic Mike.

Discography

Albums 
Ringside (2005)
Money EP (2010)
Lost Days (2011)
Fiend For You (2015)

Singles 
"Tired of Being Sorry"
"Struggle"
"Criminal"
"Money"
"Lost Days"

External links
Official RSS Feed

Ringside On Amazon
MTV

Alternative rock groups from California
Musical groups from Los Angeles
Rock music duos
Indie rock musical groups from California